Christoph Lode (born January 11, 1977 in Kaiserslautern) is a German novelist. He also publishes under the pseudonym Daniel Wolf.

Biography 
Since 2009 he has devoted himself completely to writing. He lives with his wife in Speyer.

Bibliography 

 Der Gesandte des Papstes (“The Envoy of the Pope”). Page & Turner, Munich 2008, 
 Das Vermächtnis der Seherin (“The Legacy of the Prophetess”). Page & Turner, Munich 2008, 
 Pandaemonia: Der letzte Traumwanderer (Pandæmonia: The Last Dream-Wanderer”). Goldmann, Munich 2010, 
 Pandaemonia: Die Stadt der Seelen (“Pandæmonia: The City of Souls”). Goldmann, Munich 2011, 
 Die Bruderschaft des Schwertes (“The Brotherhood of the Sword”). Goldmann, Munich 2011, 
 Pandaemonia: Phoenixfeuer (“Pandæmonia: Phœnix Fire”). Goldmann, Munich 2011, 
 (as Daniel Wolf) Das Salz der Erde (“The Salt of the Earth”). Goldmann, Munich 2013, 
 (as Daniel Wolf) Das Licht der Welt (“The Light of the World”). Goldmann, Munich 2014, 
 (as Daniel Wolf) Der Vasall des Königs ("The Vassal of the King"). Goldmann, Munich 2015, 
 (as Daniel Wolf) Das Gold des Meeres ("The Gold of the Sea"). Goldmann, Munich 2016, 
 (as Daniel Wolf) Die Gabe des Himmels ("The Gift of Heaven"). Goldmann, Munich 2018,

References

External links 
 
 Website of Christoph Lode (in German)
 Interview with Christoph Lode at montsegur.de (in German)
 Interview with Christoph Lode at literatina.de (in German)

This article is a translation of the article found on the German Wikipedia page.

German male novelists
21st-century German novelists
German historical novelists
German fantasy writers
Writers from Rhineland-Palatinate
1977 births
Living people
21st-century German male writers
21st-century pseudonymous writers